AED Studios is the largest media complex in the BeNeLux [ 1 ] located in Lint, Belgium. The complex includes infrastructure for recording programs and organizing specific events.
Movies can also be produced at the AED Studios. Iron Sky: The Coming Race was one of the recent productions. 
At the AED Studios, numerous programs are recorded for television channels such as VRT, Medialaan , MTV Networks Benelux, TMF. Some newly recorded programs include The Voice van Vlaanderen, the MIA's, Belgium 's Got Talent, So You Think You Can Dance and K3 zoekt K3.

History
The studio complex was opened on September 10, 2005 (then called Eurocam media center), and was housed in a renovated building of the former canning manufacturer Sobemi. In 2013, the AED Group bought the buildings of the bankrupt Alfacam. In 2016 AED managed to amend the studios both regarding technical content as well as rental possibilities.

External links
 

Mass media companies of Belgium